The Don Cossack Region electoral district was a constituency created for the 1917 Russian Constituent Assembly election.

The electoral district covered the Don Host Oblast. Originally assigned 17 seats, by decree of the Provisional Government the number of deputies of the Don Cossack Region district was increased to 19. The Provisional Government had provided a degree of autonomy to the Don region, recognizing the authority of the Cossacks over the land. In June 1917 General Alexey Kaledin was elected as ataman. The Kadets had sought to form a joint Kadet-Cossack list in the district, and a number of Kadet national leaders had visited the area ahead of the election. The effort failed, over differences of opinion on land ownership of non-Cossacks.

In Rostov-on-Don the Bolsheviks obtained 25,529 votes, Cossacks 14,248 votes and the Kadets 13,637 votes. In Nakhichevan-on-Don the Bolsheviks obtained 9,172 votes, Kadets 3,426 votes and Cossacks 2,556 votes. In Taganrog the Bolsheviks obtained 9,395 votes (41.7%), the SRs 4,383 votes (19.4%), the Cossacks 2,990 votes (13.3%), the Kadets 2,925 votes (13%), Mensheviks 2,436 votes (10.8%), the Popular Socialists 217 votes (0.9%), the Bloc of Socialists 126 votes (0.6%), the Landowners 49 votes (0.2%) and the Old Believers 17 votes (0.1%).

Results

References

Electoral districts of the Russian Constituent Assembly election, 1917
1910s elections in Ukraine